Patagonia: Earth's Secret Paradise is a nature documentary series exploring the landscapes and wildlife of Patagonia. The series was broadcast in three parts in the United Kingdom, where it premiered on September and October 2015 on BBC Two and BBC Two HD.

Episodes

External links
 
 

Animal Planet original programming
BBC television documentaries
BBC high definition shows
Documentary films about nature
Nature educational television series
2015 British television series debuts
2015 British television series endings
Patagonia